Ural State University of Economics (USUE) is a major Russian university situated in Ekaterinburg, Sverdlovsk Oblast.

History
It was created on 10 October 1967 as Sverdlovsk institute of national economy on the basis of a faculty of Ural State University and Sverdlovsk branch of Moscow Institute of the National Economy. Nowadays it specialises on educating students in a large variety of professions.

The current head of the university is Yakov Petrovich Silin.

The University has trained more than 40 specialists for national economy various branches and contains 7 faculties.

Economics
Finance
Management and Global Economics
Commerce
Engineering,
Extra-Mural Faculty
Institute of Reduced Program

Alumni
Manfred Kohrs
Alla Shekhovtsova
Edward Sandoyan
Sergei Svetlakov

Selected bibliographie
Tatiana Suspitsyna: Adaptation of Western Economics by Russian Universities: Intercultural Travel of an Academic Field. Routledge 2005, .

Links
  USUE official website

References

Universities in Sverdlovsk Oblast
Buildings and structures in Yekaterinburg